The Penang and Province Wellesley Volunteer Corps (Abbr.: P&PWVC), also known as Penang Volunteer Corps and Penang Volunteer Rifle was a militia unit in Malaya. It was established on 1 March 1861 and together with Singapore Volunteer Corps and Malacca Volunteer Corps, they were a part of the Crown Colony of the Straits Settlements Volunteer Force (SSVF). The Penang Volunteer Rifle was the 3rd Battalion SSVF while Singapore is 1st and 2nd Battalion SSVF and Malacca was the 4th Battalion SSVF. After the expulsion of Singapore from Malaysia in 1965, the Penang Volunteer Rifle became the oldest military unit established in Malaysia.

History 
The British, facing their biggest conflict of 19th and early 20th Century—the Crimean War—established the Singapore Volunteer Rifle Corps in 1854 (Hong Kong Volunteer Corps was also established at the same time) thus forming the SSVF. The SSVF later expanded to other Straits Settlements territories including Penang, Malacca and Labuan, and on 1 March 1861, the Penang and the Province Wellesley Volunteer Rifle was formed. In 1879, the Penang and the Province Wellesley Volunteer Rifle was disbanded and later revived as the Penang and Province Wellesley Volunteer Corps in 1899 thanks to the effort of three Penang residents, Dr Brown, M.L.C. and Mr P. Kennedy, then President of the Penang Municipal Commissioners. In the beginning, Penang Volunteer Rifle and other units in the SSVF were fully European military units. They did not accept other races into the unit until 1899 (for the Penang battalion) and 1901 (for the Singapore battalions).

The Second Boer War (1899–1902) further stimulated the volunteer movement with the formation of the volunteer rifles in Malay states (the Federated Malay States Volunteer Forces (FMSVF) and the Unfederated Malay States Volunteer Forces (UMSVF). With the Malay States Volunteer Forces, Malayan Volunteer Forces were formed and the SSVF was one of the its military components.

The SSVF's last battle was the Battle of Singapore before being overrun and defeated by the Imperial Japanese Army on 15 February 1942.

Timeline 
 1 March 1861 – The Penang and Province Wellesley Volunteer Rifle (P&PWVR) was established. Only open to European descendant.
 1879 – P&PWVR was disbanded.
 1889 (before the Boer War) – P&PWVR was revived as Penang and Province Wellesley Volunteer Corps (P&PWVC). The Headquarters was moved from Kampong Bahru to Northam Road.
 1889 – Opens its membership to European and Eurasian descent .
 1910 – Opens its membership to Malay descendant.
 August 1914 – World War I. Immediate and rapid increase in the enrolment of volunteers.
 1915 – Took part in the suppression of the Sepoy Mutiny.
 November 1933 – The P&PWVC get the first place after won almost all of the categories offered in 1933 Malaya Command Rifle Meeting.
 November 1934 – The P&PWVC placed at the first place back-to-back after won two of four main categories offered in 1934 Malaya Command Rifle Meeting. Others Top 5 teams are: Burma Rifles (Runner-Up), Selangor Battalion FMSVF (2nd Runner-Up), Wiltshire Regiment (4th Place) and Johore Military Forces (5th Place).
 1936 – The P&PWVC get the first place in 1936 Malaya Command Rifle Meeting. Others Top 5 teams are: Selangor Battalion FMSVF (Runner-Up), Johore Military Forces (2nd Runner-Up), Middlesex Regiment (4th Place) and Malay Regiment (5th Place).
 1939 – World War II. Increase in the enrolment of volunteers
 December 1941 – Battle of Penang. The battle starts on 9 December 1941 with air battle between Japanese and allied forces over Penang Island. By 13 December, the Governor of the Straits Settlements, Sir Shenton Thomas, ordered the evacuation of the European community on Penang Island to Singapore. On 15 December, most of British and Commonwealth forces withdraw from Penang. By 19 December, Penang completely falls to the Japanese.
 15 February 1942 – Last stance at Battle of Singapore. All 4 battalions of SSVF including the Penang Volunteer Corps were defeated by the Japanese Forces. Members were taken as Prisoner of war (POW) and were sent to Japanese war prisons throughout the Far East.
 Late 1945 – World War II ends. POW survivors was released in England and later return to their home.

Organisation 
The soldiers and officers of Penang and Province Wellesley Volunteer Corps (P&PWVC) were divided by ethnic. The strength of P&PWVC by the WWII is 916 men.

References 

British colonial regiments